The Diocese of Coventry is a Church of England diocese in the Province of Canterbury.  It is headed by the Bishop of Coventry, who sits at Coventry Cathedral in Coventry, and is assisted by one suffragan bishop, the Bishop of Warwick. The diocese covers Coventry and Warwickshire.

The diocese is divided into two archdeaconries, Warwick and Coventry. Warwick archdeaconry is then divided into the deaneries of Shipston, Fosse, Alcester, Southam and Warwick & Leamington, whilst Coventry archdeaconry is divided into the deaneries of Rugby, Nuneaton, Kenilworth, and Coventry South, East and North.

The diocese was formed on 6 September 1918 from part of the Diocese of Worcester.

An ancient Diocese of Coventry existed , united with Lichfield, in 1102–1837 with the see in Coventry until 1539.  
 
In 1837 Coventry passed to the Diocese of Worcester and the title ended.  Two suffragan Bishops of Coventry existed  in 1891–1903.

Bishops
The current diocesan Bishop of Coventry is Christopher Cocksworth, who is assisted by John Stroyan, Bishop suffragan of Warwick. The provincial episcopal visitor (for parishes in the diocese who reject the ministry of priests who are women) is the Bishop suffragan of Ebbsfleet, who is licensed as an honorary assistant bishop of the diocese in order to facilitate his work there.

David Evans, a former Bishop of Peru and Bolivia, has been licensed as an honorary assistant bishop in the diocese since 2003; returned to England in 1988 and retired to Warwick in 2010.

Archdeaconries and archdeacons
While the diocese is divided into archdeaconries and has archdeacons like other dioceses, Coventry diocese is unique in that the two do not correlate. In 2010, the post of Archdeacon of Warwick was replaced by that of Archdeacon Missioner (Morris Rodham was appointed) and statutory oversight over the archdeaconry of Warwick was delegated to the Archdeacon of Coventry (then Ian Watson). Following Watson's retirement in 2012, John Green was appointed as Acting Archdeacon of Coventry pending his installation into the new role of Archdeacon Pastor, which duly occurred on 9 December 2012. These arrangements follow the Bishop's 2009 document Signposts for the Future, and the creation of the two posts of Archdeacon Missioner and Archdeacon Pastor are consistent with the suggested "transitional period" after which there will be only one archdeacon in the diocese. Rodham and Green remained, legally, collated to the Archdeaconries of Warwick and of Coventry. Green retired at the end of August 2017, and Clive Hogger joined him as Acting Archdeacon for July and August, then remained Acting Archdeacon after Green's retirement. Sue Field was collated Archdeacon Pastor and Archdeacon of Coventry on 18 March 2018; Barry Dugmore was collated Archdeacon Missioner and Archdeacon of Warwick on 6 October 2019. Field was required to resign in January 2023 following disciplinary proceedings.

List of churches

References
Church of England Statistics 2002

External links
Diocese of Coventry

 
Christian organizations established in 1918
Coventry
Coventry